Saved by Magic is the 2005 debut double LP release from stoner rock band Brant Bjork and the Bros, and fifth solo album by Brant Bjork. The album was released on Brant Bjork's personal label, Duna Records.

Track listings

CD

Vinyl

Personnel
The Bros

Brant Bjork – guitar, vocals
Dylan Roche – bass
Scott "Cortez" Silverman – guitar
Michael Peffer – drums, percussion

Credits
Additional Guitars on "Sweet Maria's Dreams" & "Avenida de la Revolución" by Mario Lalli

Produced by The Older Kids

Recorded at Rancho de la Luna, Joshua Tree, CA

Engineered by Tony Mason

Mixed by Tony Mason & Brant Bjork

Mastered by Brian "Big Bass" Gardner

All songs by Brant Bjork and the Bros (Dune Boogie Tunez BMI & 3BSound BMI)
Except "Sunshine of Your Love" by Cream and "2000 Man" by The Rolling Stones

Album Illustration by Adamstab

Colorized by Chris Henry with Adamstab

Duna Art direction and layout by Cale Bunker & SweetnLow

Management and booking by Denise DiVitto

Notes
 The vinyl release is separated into four tracks, "Fuckin' A, Fuckin' Be, Fuckin' See?, Fuckin' Dee Dee", with the first three tracks containing five songs, and the last track containing four songs.
 Brant Bjork covers the Cream hit "Sunshine of Your Love". The song is absent from the digital versions.
 At the end of "Avenida de la Revolución", (Cream's "SWLABR") can be heard playing on the background.
 At the end of "Arcade Eyes" is a cover of the song "2000 Man" by The Rolling Stones.

References

Brant Bjork albums
2005 albums